Marioara Trașcă (since the 1989 rowing season Curelea, born 29 October 1962) is a retired Romanian rower. Competing in coxed fours and eights she won three medals at the 1984 and 1988 Olympics and three world titles in 1986–1987.

References

External links 
 

1962 births
Living people
Romanian female rowers
Sportspeople from Bucharest
Rowers at the 1984 Summer Olympics
Rowers at the 1988 Summer Olympics
Olympic silver medalists for Romania
Olympic bronze medalists for Romania
Olympic medalists in rowing
World Rowing Championships medalists for Romania
Medalists at the 1988 Summer Olympics
Medalists at the 1984 Summer Olympics
Olympic rowers of Romania